Tangxia may refer to the following locations in China:

 Tangxia, Dongguan (塘厦镇), town in Guangdong
 Tangxia, Jiangmen (棠下镇), town in Pengjiang District, Jiangmen, Guangdong
 Tangxia, Rui'an (塘下镇), town in Zhejiang